BrickFest was the first convention for adult fans of LEGO (AFOLs) in the United States. The focus was to have fans bring their creations, often referred to as MOCs (My Own Creations), to display and share with fellow enthusiasts.

Like other conventions, it offered workshops, presentations, special events and challenges.

BrickFest was typically held on a weekend in mid-August in the Washington, D.C. area annually from 2000 through 2006. The 2007 and 2009 BrickFests were held in Portland, Oregon at the Oregon Convention Center. BrickFest 2011 and BrickFest as a whole was cancelled by the organizers, with staffing issues cited.

Private convention
The main focus of the private convention was to provide a venue for adult fans of LEGO to bring and display their own LEGO creations. Activities at the convention included presentations, seminars, round-table discussions and contests. The full attendee received a Convention Packet containing a personalized brick name badge and a program of activities.

Public exhibition
The Public Exhibition had a focus of inviting LEGO fans of all ages of the general public to view hundreds of hobbyist-built creations and meet their creators.

Locations and dates

References

External links
 BrickFest homepage
 BrickFest at BrickWiki

Lego conventions
Conventions in the United States
Recurring events established in 2000
2000 establishments in the United States
August events
Recurring events disestablished in 2009
2009 disestablishments in the United States